Timothy Jerome Houston  (born April 10, 1970) is a Canadian politician who is the 30th and current premier of Nova Scotia since 2021. He was first elected to the Nova Scotia House of Assembly in the 2013 provincial election. A member of the Progressive Conservative Party of Nova Scotia, he represents the electoral district of Pictou East. Houston also served as the leader of the opposition from 2018 to 2021. He and the Progressive Conservative party won a majority government in the 2021 Nova Scotia general election, becoming the first Progressive Conservative premier since 2009.

Career
Born in Halifax, Nova Scotia, Houston lived in several different places around the world as his father was in the military. His family eventually re-settled in Halifax and Houston attended Halifax West High School.

Houston attended Saint Mary's University, graduating in 1992 with a Bachelor of Commerce. He then moved to Bermuda, working there as a consultant from 1995 to 2007. Houston then worked as a chartered accountant and as a financial consultant with Deloitte. On November 2, 2020, he was awarded the profession’s highest mark of distinction, the Fellow (FCPA) designation, by Chartered Professional Accountants of Nova Scotia.

Political career
On November 27, 2012, Houston won the Progressive Conservative nomination in the riding of Pictou East for the 2013 Nova Scotia general election.

He was elected MLA of Pictou East on October 8, 2013, with 48.08% of the vote.

Houston was re-elected on May 30, 2017 with 73.88% of the vote.

On November 19, 2017, Houston announced his candidacy for the  leadership of the Progressive Conservative Party of Nova Scotia. Houston was elected leader of the Progressive Conservative Party after the first ballot results were announced on October 27, 2018, at the Party's Leadership Convention in Halifax. Houston earned 48.96% of the points on the first ballot, leaving other candidates no clear path to victory. The other candidates conceded after the first ballot.

Houston has been publicly open to the option of fracking in Nova Scotia, a controversial stance. He has said as Leader of the Opposition, he would not criticize the Government without offering his own ideas in response.

2021 provincial election

The incumbent Liberals held a 75% approval rating in June 2021. In an upset, Houston and the Progressive Conservative party won a majority government in the 2021 Nova Scotia general election, becoming the first Progressive Conservative premier since 2009. Houston ran on a Red Tory platform that promised more spending on health care.

Premier of Nova Scotia

Houston and his cabinet were sworn in on August 31, 2021.

Healthcare system 
Houston was elected on a platform to fix Nova Scotia's healthcare system.

A day after being sworn in, Houston fired the CEO and board of the Nova Scotia Health Authority (NSHA), the provincial healthcare provider. He stated that he "needed a clean slate at the helm of his leadership team" for the Tories' intended overhaul of the healthcare system. Houston appointed a new NSHA board as well as a new CEO, Karen Oldfield, who possessed no healthcare experience. Critics drew attention to the lack of diversity of the new board, as the first and only Black and Indigenous board members were both dismissed.

The Houston government lifted Nova Scotia's COVID-19 measures in March 2022, including public health restrictions and mask requirements. Infectious disease experts questioned the move and predicted a rise in cases. In May 2022, the government lifted mask requirements in public schools. In July 2022, the government ended the requirement for those infected with COVID-19 to isolate. The lifting of pandemic precautions led to a surge in the disease (and associated deaths) and strained the healthcare system.

By mid-2022, Nova Scotia's family doctor waitlist hit an all-time high of 100,000, prompting opposition leaders to accuse Houston of breaking his campaign promise to fix healthcare.

Crown corporations 
Shortly after taking office, Houston launched a review of 20 provincial Crown corporations to "[ensure] the most efficient and accountable methodology for the undertaking of their respective tasks".

In July 2022, the Houston government announced a reshuffle of several agencies. Nova Scotia Lands and Develop Nova Scotia will be merged to form a new corporation called Build Nova Scotia. Innovacorp, Nova Scotia Business Inc. (NSBI), and the Invest Nova Scotia Fund will be merged into the new Invest Nova Scotia. Decision-making power was removed from boards, with the organisations placed under direct government control: Invest Nova Scotia will report directly to the minister of economic development, while Build Nova Scotia will be overseen by the minister for public works. Existing CEOs and boards were sacked.

Houston was accused of nepotism after appointing "personal friends" as interim CEOs of the two new agencies; Tom Hickey will lead Invest Nova Scotia, while Wayne Crawley will head Build Nova Scotia. Each will receive up to $18,000 a month in remuneration. Nova Scotia NDP leader Claudia Chender criticised Houston for hiring friends rather than putting the posts to open competition. Houston defended the appointments, stating that Hickey and Crawley were the most qualified. Hickey resigned two weeks into his appointment, citing an inability to commit enough time to the role.

Art gallery 
Citing rising costs, Houston announced in July 2022 an indefinite "pause" to plans to construct a new Art Gallery of Nova Scotia. Construction was supposed to begin in late 2022 on a new gallery complex, designed by Halifax architect Omar Gandhi, on the Halifax waterfront.

Personal life
Houston lives in Pictou County with his wife Carol, and children Paget and Zachary.

In 2017, it came to light that his name had been mentioned several times in the Paradise Papers. because he held management positions with Bermuda-based reinsurance companies while living and working in Bermuda, where he was listed as director and vice-president of Inter-Ocean Holdings and several related companies.

Bills introduced

Electoral record

|-
 
|Progressive Conservative
|Tim Houston
|align="right"| 5,275
|align="right"| 73.88
|align="right"| +25.83
|-
 
|Liberal
|John Fraser
|align="right"| 1,301
|align="right"| 18.22
|align="right"| +2.33
|-
 
|New Democratic Party
|Deborah Stiles
|align="right"| 564
|align="right"| 7.90
|align="right"| -28.17
|}

|-
 
|Progressive Conservative
|Tim Houston
|align="right"| 3,713
|align="right"| 48.04
|align="right"|+22.11
|-
  
|New Democratic Party
|Clarrie MacKinnon
|align="right"| 2,788
|align="right"| 36.07
|align="right"|-27.91
|-
 
|Liberal
|Francois Rochon
|align="right"| 1,228
|align="right"| 15.89
|align="right"|+7.50
|}

References

1970 births
Living people
Nova Scotia political party leaders
Progressive Conservative Association of Nova Scotia MLAs
Premiers of Nova Scotia
Members of the Executive Council of Nova Scotia
People from Halifax, Nova Scotia
People from Pictou County
21st-century Canadian politicians